James Charles Moeser (born April 3, 1939) is a musician and university administrator who served as the ninth chancellor of the University of North Carolina at Chapel Hill. He is a trained concert organist. A native of Colorado City, Texas, Moeser earned bachelor's and master's degrees in music from the University of Texas at Austin and a doctorate from the University of Michigan.

Moeser, formerly chancellor of the University of Nebraska–Lincoln, began his work as chancellor at UNC on August 15, 2000. While at UNC he oversaw and introduced many historic changes and improvements for the university, including the Carolina Covenant, Carolina First campaign, Carolina Connects initiative, expansions of genome research at the university, and the passing of a referendum for the nation's largest higher education bond package.  Moeser announced on September 26, 2007 that he would relinquish his position as Chancellor on June 30, 2008. He was succeeded by Holden Thorp on June 30, 2008. Following a year-long sabbatical, Moeser returned to UNC as Chancellor Emeritus and professor in the music department.

References

External links
 Inventory of the Office of Chancellor of the University of North Carolina at Chapel Hill: James Moeser Records, 2000-2007, in the University Archives, UNC-Chapel Hill.
UNC Office of the Chancellor
Welcome Dialogue for Moeser, Summer 2000

People from Colorado City, Texas
Leaders of the University of North Carolina at Chapel Hill
University of Texas at Austin College of Fine Arts alumni
University of Michigan alumni
Living people
1939 births
Chancellors of the University of Nebraska-Lincoln